Jahongirmirza Turobov is an Uzbekistani freestyle wrestler. He won the gold medal in the men's 61 kg event at the 2021 Islamic Solidarity Games held in Konya, Turkey.

Career 

He competed in the men's 57 kg event the Golden Grand Prix Ivan Yarygin 2018 held in Krasnoyarsk, Russia. He competed in the 61 kg event at the 2019 Asian Wrestling Championships held in Xi'an, China. In that same year, he competed in the 57 kg event at the World Wrestling Championships held in Nur-Sultan, Kazakhstan. He won his first match and he was then eliminated in his next match by Erdenebatyn Bekhbayar of Mongolia.

He competed in the men's 61 kg event at the 2020 Asian Wrestling Championships held in New Delhi, India. He won the gold medal in his event at the 2021 Asian Wrestling Championships held in Almaty, Kazakhstan. He competed in the 2021 Waclaw Ziolkowski Memorial  held in Warsaw, Poland.

In 2022, he competed in the men's 61 kg event at the Asian Wrestling Championships held in Ulaanbaatar, Mongolia. A few months later, he won the gold medal in the men's 61 kg event at the 2021 Islamic Solidarity Games held in Konya, Turkey. He competed in the 61kg event at the 2022 World Wrestling Championships held in Belgrade, Serbia.

Achievements

References

External links 
 

Living people
Year of birth missing (living people)
Place of birth missing (living people)
Uzbekistani male sport wrestlers
Islamic Solidarity Games competitors for Uzbekistan
Islamic Solidarity Games medalists in wrestling
21st-century Uzbekistani people